Vavuni Kulam ( Vavuṉi Kuḷam) is an irrigation tank in northern Sri Lanka, approximately  south east of Mallavi.

History
The tank on Pali Aru was earlier knowns as Peli Vapi.

The left and right bank sluices were each 4 ft by 3 ft 6 in whilst the central sluice had a diameter of 18 in. By 2014 the tank was capable of irrigating .

References

Irrigation tanks in Sri Lanka
Bodies of water of Mullaitivu District
Lakes of Sri Lanka